Kurchenko is a gender-neutral Ukrainian surname. It may refer to:

 Andrii Kurchenko (born 1965), Ukrainian physician
 Nadezhda Kurchenko (1950–1970), Soviet flight attendant involved in the hijacking of Aeroflot Flight 244
2349 Kurchenko, a main-belt asteroid named after Nadezhda Kurchenko
 Serhiy Kurchenko (born 1985), Ukrainian businessman
 Viktor Kurchenko (born 1965), Ukrainian archer

See also
 

Ukrainian-language surnames